NGC 3558 is an elliptical or a lenticular galaxy located 440 million light-years away in the constellation Ursa Major. It was discovered by the astronomer Heinrich d'Arrest on April 15, 1866. It is a member of the galaxy cluster Abell 1185 and is classified as a LINER galaxy.

See also 
 List of NGC objects (3001–4000)
 NGC 3561

References

External links
 

3558
33960
Ursa Major (constellation)
Astronomical objects discovered in 1866
Lenticular galaxies
LINER galaxies
Elliptical galaxies
Abell 1185
Discoveries by Heinrich Louis d'Arrest